Helene Ruth Paula Ritchie (née Hess; born 16 March 1945) is a former local body politician, registered psychologist and mediator, and a board member from Wellington, New Zealand. As Wellington's longest serving City Councillor of over 30 years, she led the Labour team to a majority position on the council. Later, she was the first female deputy mayor and chaired the Wellington Airport Authority and its successor for eight years.

Ritchie led the declaration of Wellington as a Nuclear Weapon Free Zone, chaired Wellington's Civic Centre project from its concept plan to Council decision, and chaired a six-year project aimed at protecting Wellington's Town Belt. This culminated in legislative protection, the Wellington Town Belt Act 2016, and 130 hectares were added to the Town Belt.

Ritchie served on a range of public sector boards ranging from health, mental health, arts, museums, the natural environment, airports and councils.

Early life

Ritchie was born in Wellington to refugee parents who had fled the Holocaust in Prague, arriving in New Zealand in 1939 and 1940. She grew up in the state housing area of Naenae. She attended Hutt Valley High School and became head prefect.

She studied psychology, education, languages and dispute resolution at Victoria University of Wellington and Massey University of Palmerston North where she was awarded three postgraduate degrees: Master of Arts, Bachelor of Arts with Honours, Bachelor of Educational Studies, and an undergraduate Bachelor of Arts degree, and two diplomas: a Diploma of Education and a Diploma of Business Studies (conflict and dispute resolution).

Ritchie then worked as a secondary school teacher, later a university extension lecturer, an executive director of a trade union correspondence education service and in early childhood education. She undertook psychology training and was appointed as a psychologist in the Education Department in 1977 (initially assistant psychologist, then psychologist in 1978), focusing on children and families with special needs. She helped to develop an approach away from deficit diagnosing and labeling to identifying strengths and needs and enhancing them through a psycho-social and educational approach and developing individual educational plans ("IEPs"). She ensured funding and approval for alternative schooling for young people who otherwise no longer attended traditional secondary schools, and establishment of a new 'Work Experience Unit' within a secondary school for young persons who found traditional schooling too challenging.

In 1966, she married Peter Deans Ritchie and had two children: Timothy in 1971 and Jonathan in 1972.

Political career

National politics
Ritchie came into politics in the 1970s through the women's movement and joined the Labour Party in 1976. She helped develop the Working Women's Charter, led by trade unionist and M.P. Sonja Davies, and was a member of the Labour Women's Council. She later took on leadership roles in the local Women's Electoral Lobby (WEL).

Parliamentary Candidate 
At a time when only four of 87 members of Parliament were women and only 13 women had ever served in Parliament, Ritchie was selected by Labour for the then safe National seat of Ohariu electorate in the New Zealand House of Representatives in the 1978 general election. She was unsuccessful and placed second behind National's Hugh Templeton.

She sought selection for the safe Labour seat of Christchurch Central in a 1979 by-election. Geoffrey Palmer, later briefly Prime Minister, was selected. She also stood for selection in a number of other safe Labour seats, including the Napier electorate in 1980 where she lost to Geoff Braybrooke, who held the seat until 2002.

Ritchie had also attempted to gain the Labour nomination for the Island Bay electorate in the lead up to the 1987 general election after Frank O'Flynn announced his retirement, but the nomination ultimately went to Elizabeth Tennet. Ritchie stated she was "knocked for six" after failing to win the Island Bay nomination. Soon after she stood for the Pencarrow electorate, but lost again, this time to trade unionist Sonja Davies.

Upon Braybrooke announcing his retirement in 2001, Ritchie was invited by the electorate chair to again seek the Napier seat, but lost out on the nomination to Russell Fairbrother.

Wellington City Councillor

First female Labour Leader Wellington City Council
Ritchie was first elected to the Wellington City Council in 1977, serving for 12 years until resigning in 1989. She was elected concurrently to the first Wellington Regional Council in 1980, from which she resigned in 1983. During those 12 years, she was voted in as Labour's first female leader from 1980 to 1986, and was selected as the Labour candidate for Mayor (the first woman) in 1983, finishing runner-up to Ian Lawrence.

As Chair of the Airport Authority from 1980 for eight years and of all the Airport Authorities in New Zealand for five years, she defied Labour Minister Prebble's early attempt at privatisation of public assets.

Ritchie saw this as a betrayal of Labour's fundamental policies, and as contrary to her reason for joining the Party. Along with many others, she left the Labour Party in 1989. (Prebble and Douglas later left the Labour Party to become leaders of the right wing ACT Party, with Roger Douglas as founder.) Jim Anderton M.P. (later deputy Prime Minister) resigned from the Party in April 1989, saying, "I did not leave the Party, the Party left me". and created the Alliance Party. Ritchie rejoined the Labour Party after a gap of few years, but still stood for election as an Independent.

In 1986, Ritchie became Deputy Mayor to Jim Belich, the first woman to hold the position in the Capital. She was dumped by her Labour colleagues on the council in 1988. According to Ritchie, no reason was ever given and she thought the episode was "very unfair and unjust". In October 1989, she stepped down as a councillor and stood for both the Mayoralty and Regional Council as an independent candidate. She placed second to Labour's Jim Belich, with 26% of the vote, and was elected to the Wellington Regional Council for a second term.

Ritchie stood for Mayor for a third time in 1992 as an independent, finishing second with 17% of the vote, compared to the 33% gained by the Labour candidate and former Wellington Central MP Fran Wilde.

Ritchie stepped out of politics for six years to care for her terminally ill husband.

She was re-elected in the Northern ward in 1998  and remained on the council for a further 18 years until 2016 when she resigned as a councillor to run for the mayoralty again.

Apartheid and racism 
In 1981 Ritchie established a delegation of prominent persons throughout New Zealand and co-led that delegation with the first Ombudsman, Sir Guy Powles, to present a submission to the Governor General Sir David Beattie, disclaiming apartheid and seeking a stop to the 1981 Springbok Tour of New Zealand.

Declaration of Wellington as a nuclear weapon free zone 
One of Ritchie's achievements was the declaration of Wellington as a nuclear weapon free zone in 1982. This declaration came at a time when a nuclear warship, the USS Truxton, was about to enter Wellington Harbour. Within one year, half of New Zealand was living in declared nuclear weapon free zones, and women were spurred on to increase their representation in local government. There was major political fallout too: Mayor Michael Fowler, aligned to the National Party, announced the day after the motion was passed that he would quit at the end of the term.

Despite two of his own team crossing the floor, he lashed out in a Dominion article at Labour councillors, particularly attacking the Labour women - three of whom he had once called the "petticoat troika" and who were then in the majority of the Labour team. Reportedly he was also furious with his own two councillors Betty Campbell and David Bull, who had crossed the floor of the council to vote with the Labour councillors and ensure that the motion was passed and the Declaration made.

Then on 14 June 1984, Prime Minister Robert Muldoon, furious that one of his members (Marilyn Waring) had crossed the floor and voted with the opposition to support the Bill banning nuclear ships, called a snap election which he then lost. A Labour Government and Prime Minister David Lange were elected on the issue, and later successfully passed the New Zealand Nuclear Free Zone, Disarmament and Arms Control Act 1987.

Moa Point Campaign 
Between 1984 and 1989 Ritchie spearheaded and led as a councillor the five year city-wide Moa Point campaign to build a sewage treatment plant. Council finally agreed in 1989, ensuring that the city adopted land-based treatment to stop raw sewage being discharged into the ocean.

Civic Centre 
In 1986 Ritchie chaired the Civic Centre project, saying it would give Wellington a heart. Earlier, in 1982, Ritchie's motion stopped the demolition intention of the then mayor Michael Fowler, of the historic Wellington Town Hall. The later strengthening and upgrade of the Town Hall then in became part of the Civic Centre project. Two years later, in 1988 on the cusp of her then being dumped from the deputy mayoralty and all of the appointed positions which she held, she ensured Council adopted unanimously the concept plan which included an integrated and innovative concept of eclectic and world class architecture, the protection of older buildings threatened with demolition – the former City Library and the Town Hall – and the construction of new buildings and an open Civic public square (formerly road), complete with the tall emblematic Nikau palm structures. This concept plan excluded the earlier 1986 proposal to build on what became Ilott Green. The retention of this small green open space, where formerly the Circa Theatre had stood, continued then to be fought over as for over 20 years, as successive Councils proposed various building developments for it.

Johnsonville Library and Pool upgrade
Ritchie focused and campaigned for years in her ward for a new library for Johnsonville alongside the upgraded pool and community centre as a cohesive community hub. The library was formally agreed by the council in the 2006 Johnsonville Town Centre Plan. In 2009, she secured council support for her motion to ensure the new library be built next door to the Keith Spry Pool. Between 2010 and 2013, council staff and a newly elected councillor again deferred the project and looked at a range of new locations. In 2011, four potential sites were consulted and the Northern Ward public and council again agreed for the site to be co-located with the Keith Spry Pool. In February 2014, She secured funding approval from the council. Planning started then, construction began in 2016, and the community hub was planned to be opened in 2019.

Press Council Ritchie versus the Dominion Post
In 2007 the Press Council upheld a complaint on the grounds of inaccuracy about two articles in the Dominion Post - as well as a third - that reported on Wellington City councillor Helene Ritchie's attendance record and remuneration while on sick leave for breast cancer. This had followed an earlier attempt by four male councillors to block (by walking out of the vote) her request for sick leave.

Wellington Waterfront  
Ritchie also focused on open and recreational space on the waterfront, personally and successfully submitting to the Environment Court, alongside Waterfront Watch led by Pauline Swann, to ensure open public space instead of a Hilton Hotel colonising a large part of the Waterfront for private gain and use. The Court in its decision said: “Mr McClelland and Mrs Ritchie. We felt in many ways their use and appreciation of the wharf as a safe and relatively vehicle free space reflected that of the Wellington public who use the waterfront and promenade.”.

“Wellington City Councillor Helene Ritchie who was one of the appellants said the decision vindicated her stand against the project. Mrs Ritchie said the decision showed the City Council needed to “get real” about the Waterfront and acknowledge public concern about how it was being developed.”

Supercity proposal 2009–2016 
She initiated opposition, and repeatedly over six years. Ultimately successful along with others, stopping the proposal that Wellington follow Auckland and become a “Super City”.

Health Board and Mental Health
Her focus as a Health Board member was primarily on improving mental health services establishing and heading a mental health subcommittee, and on attempting to lower the rate of suicides  and on the provision of home and community support services.

Eventually in 2010, after years’ long campaigns, she succeeded in to persuading the board members, Chief Executives and the chair, the Ministry of Health officials and Minister, to approve the necessary funding for a replacement and upgraded mental health recovery unit in the hospital.

In 2016 Ritchie was in the media headlights after being caught parking her car (which had her name written on the bonnet and doors) over a pedestrian crossing in the carpark at Wellington Hospital. She later apologised for the incident and stated that as a section of the carpark was fenced off by construction workers, she was worried that she would be late for a meeting if she spent any longer searching for a space.

Wellington Town Belt and Wellington’s Natural Environment 
Ritchie's last six years on the council were primarily devoted to improving the natural environment in Wellington in her role as Portfolio leader of the natural environment - extending the Outer Town Belt with the procuring of land and earlier protecting the Old Coach Road in the Northern Ward after many years and alongside much effort by local people.

The 2016 Wellington Town Belt Act was developed by the Council committee, and consulted on with the Wellington public. Introduced by the local member of Parliament, Grant Robertson, it protected and enhanced the over 600 hectares of public green space around the inner city.

In 2016, Ritchie resigned as a councillor but stood for the mayoralty. She gained 3.7% of the vote, placing her sixth of nine candidates.

Ritchie then took a sabbatical to research, write and pursue other priorities.

Notes

References

1945 births
Living people
New Zealand people of Czech descent
20th-century New Zealand women politicians
20th-century New Zealand politicians
Victoria University of Wellington alumni
People from Wellington City
People educated at Hutt Valley High School
Deputy mayors of Wellington
Wellington City Councillors
Wellington regional councillors
New Zealand Labour Party politicians
Unsuccessful candidates in the 1978 New Zealand general election
Capital and Coast District Health Board members